Joan van der Spriet (c. 1660, Delft – c. 1690, London), was a Dutch Golden Age painter.

Biography
According to Houbraken he grew up in the Delft orphanage and became a pupil of Johannes Verkolje. He was a good portrait painter who moved to England and after marrying there, settled there.

According to the RKD he was also a printmaker, but no known works survive.

References

1660s births
1690s deaths
Dutch Golden Age painters
Dutch male painters
Artists from Delft